The 2022 FA Community Shield was the 100th FA Community Shield, an annual football match played between the winners of the previous season's Premier League, Manchester City, and the winners of the previous season's FA Cup, Liverpool. The match was played on 30 July 2022.

For the first time in 10 years, the match took place away from the usual Wembley Stadium due to the hosting of the UEFA Women's Euro 2022 final and was instead played at Leicester City's King Power Stadium.

The match was televised live in the United Kingdom on ITV.

Liverpool won the match 3–1 for their 16th FA Community Shield title, the first in 16 years. With the game played at the much-reduced capacity of Leicester City's stadium, there were 28,545 spectators, the lowest number for a Charity Shield or Community Shield game since 23,988 watched Burnley beat Manchester City 1–0 at Maine Road in 1973.

Background 
 
Liverpool won their FA Cup title after their match against Chelsea resulted in a 0–0 draw in the final, after extra time, and then 6–5 on penalties. Manchester City won their FA Community Shield position by virtue of winning the 2021–22 Premier League. This was a rematch of the 2019 FA Community Shield, which Manchester City won on penalties.

Match

Summary
In the 21st minute Mohamed Salah passed to Trent Alexander-Arnold from the right and he opened the scoring with a curling effort from the edge of the box which took a slight deflection off Nathan Aké and nestled in the left corner of the net. With twenty minutes to go, Manchester City equalised when Julián Álvarez scored by poking the ball into the net from close range after Liverpool goalkeeper Adrián had initially saved a shot from substitute Phil Foden. The goal was awarded after a lengthy VAR check. With seven minutes left, Liverpool were awarded a penalty after Rúben Dias had handled a header from substitute Darwin Núñez with his right hand inside the penalty area. Salah scored the penalty with a low shot to the right corner. In the fourth minute of injury time, Núñez made it 3–1 when he stooped low to head the ball to the net after the ball was headed down to him from the left by Andrew Robertson after an initial cross from the right by Salah.

Details

References

FA Community Shield
Community Shield
Charity Shield 2022
Charity Shield 2022
FA Community Shield
Sport in Leicester